Nancy Dolly Victoria Steele (1923–2001), was a Sierra Leonean politician and labour activist. Steele was a member of the APC political party in Sierra Leone.

Early life
Nancy Dolly Victoria Grant was born in 1923 in Freetown, Sierra Leone to working-class Sierra Leone Creole parents.

Political career
Steele was leader of the National Congress of Sierra Leone Women (NCSLW), founded in 1960 as the women's wing of the All People's Congress (APC). She served as a member of the Sierra Leone Parliament and was also acting Mayor of the Freetown City Council.

Personal life
Nancy Steele was married to Marcus Steele, an Afro-Caribbean trade unionist. The couple had a son who died in infancy.

Death
Steele died in 2001 in Freetown, Sierra Leone.

References

Sierra Leonean politicians
Sierra Leone Creole people
People of Sierra Leone Creole descent
1923 births
2001 deaths